Eireann Cathlin Nugent (born 1 April 1992) is a boxer from Northern Ireland. She participated in the 2022 Commonwealth Games.

References 

Living people
Boxers at the 2022 Commonwealth Games
Commonwealth Games competitors for Northern Ireland
1992 births
Commonwealth Games bronze medallists for Northern Ireland
Commonwealth Games medallists in boxing
Medallists at the 2022 Commonwealth Games